

The Farman F.270 was a prototype French bomber/torpedo-bomber designed and built by the Farman Aviation Works for the French Air Force.

Development
The F.270 of 1933 was a development of the earlier F.60 and F.150 series it was a mixed wood and metal sesquiplane with a single vertical tail unit. Powered by two Gnome-Rhône 14Kbr radial engines mounted above the lower wing. It had a wide-track tailskid landing gear and three machine-gun positions, one in the balcony type nose, one amidships and one in a ventral position that fired though a trap door in the floor.

In 1934 an improved variant was produced, the Farman F.271, with engine power boosted to 800 hp (597 kW) additional nose glazing for the bomb/torpedo aimer, and larger navigators station, and the ventral trap door replaced with a retractable bathtub gondola. Neither type entered production but the F.271 was later tested on floats.

Variants
F.270
Prototype with Gnome-Rhône 14Kbr radial engines.
F.271
Improved design with 800hp (597kW) Gnome-Rhône 14K radial engines, also tested as a float-plane.

Specifications (F.271)

See also

References

Notes

Bibliography

1930s French bomber aircraft
F.270
Sesquiplanes
Aircraft first flown in 1933
Twin piston-engined tractor aircraft